Stephen B. Blackwell (born August 5, 1849) was a state legislator in Mississippi.

He was born in Issaquena County and represented it in the Mississippi House of Representatives from 1882 to 1889. He was a Republican and a Baptist.

After his 1887 re-election he was to be one of ten Republicans in the Mississippi House, five of them "colored".

See also
African-American officeholders during and following the Reconstruction era

References

Baptists from Mississippi
People from Issaquena County, Mississippi
African-American state legislators in Mississippi
African-American politicians during the Reconstruction Era
Mississippi Republicans
1849 births
Year of death missing